Load Wedding is a 2018 Pakistani romantic comedy film, which is mutually written by the director Nabeel Qureshi and the producer, Fizza Ali Meerza under the banner of Filmwala Pictures. The film stars Fahad Mustafa and Mehwish Hayat in lead roles. Released on Eid al-Adha; 22 August 2018, it was distributed by IMGC nationwide, and by Zee Studios internationally.

Cast
 Fahad Mustafa as Raja
 Sadoon as young Raja
 Mehwish Hayat as Meerab "Meeru" Khurram
 Hamna Amir as young Meeru
 Samina Ahmad as Raja's Mother
 Faiza Hasan as Farhana "Baby Baji"; Raja's sister
 Noor ul Hassan as Khalil; Raja's uncle
 Mohsin Abbas Haider as young Khalil (special appearance)
 Qaiser Piya  as Nazeer; Raja's best friend
 Fahad Khan as young Nazeer
 Fahim Khan as Aashiq Rafaqat; TV show host
 Hania Amir  as young Khalil's love interest (special appearance)
 Shanzay Khan as Meeru's sister
 Ehtisham ud Din as Meeru's brother-in-law
 Ghazala Butt as Anam
 Om Puri as Raja's late father (tribute)
 Anjum Habibi
 Ghalib Kamal
 Kehkashan Faisal
 Ijaz
 Razia Malik

Production
Fahad Mustafa hinted the film in February 2017. Film was announced on 8 December. This will be his fourth collaboration with director-producer-duo Nabeel Qureshi and Fizza Ali Meerza. Qureshi commented on this that he feels best at working with him, and further revealed that it will be a different film from his previous three films. "There are a lot of things that I and Fizza believe in and we are trying to say them", he said to Gulf News.

This was Mehwish Hayat's third collaboration with the three of them, including 2016 film Actor in Law. She commented on the film that it "tackles social issues prevalent in our society that need to be highlighted", for which her character is different from her previous ones, she said it as "a very traditional desi role". Meerza commented that they are "truly one of the finest actors our industry has". She said that the film explains "the load that comes" in the society "with the wedding". Mustafa shared with The News, "two of the biggest filmmakers in the country want to work with me and release their films at the same time", where he talked about this film and Nadeem Baig's Jawani Phir Nahi Ani 2.

On 13 July, HIP reported that Mohsin Abbas Haider has co-written the film, as well as wrote the lyrics for two songs and has sung one of them.

Release
Film teaser was released on 27 June, and trailer on 17 July. The film was premiered on 18 August in Lahore, on 19 August in Dubai and on 21 August in Karachi. It released on Eid al-Adha worldwide; 22 August 2018, and on 23 August in UAE.

Despite getting mostly positive reviews, the film could not manage to do well business at the box office due to very limited number of screens it got, as compared to the competitor films Jawani Phir Nahi Ani 2 of ARY Films and Parwaaz Hai Junoon of Hum Films. The director Nabeel Qureshi called it "unfair distribution", while the cinemas' management said that the "public demand" was on priority. Geo Films was also blamed for not promoting the film correctly, as others were doing.

Reception

Critical reception
Amna Karim writing for Bolo Jawan gave the film 4 out of 5 stars, appreciating Nabeel Qureshi for bringing a socially responsible narrative to Pakistani cinema. Shahjehan Saleem of Something Haute rated the film 4 out 5 stars and said, "the film does suffer from a few hiccups", however, these are not "big enough to affect the narrative", because set on "family problems", it has "the stars along with substance and soul". Omair Alavi rated 3.5 stars out of 5 and praised, "Everything from art direction to dialogues to actors' accent is perfect", adding that the social message is something to ponderthe audience. Sonia Ashraf wrote to DAWN Images praised the film due to the message in love story and most of the characters, but criticized the script length. Rahul Aijaz of The Express Tribune rated 2 out of 5 stars and said that despite the "strong message" about "social mockery" of marriage concept, the film "fails to be an up-to-the-mark film for multiple reasons."

International screening
The film was screened at the 2019 Jaipur International Film Festival, and was nominated in the category of Best Film. It was also screened at the 2019 Rajasthan International Film Festival, and it won in the category of Best Feature Film International.

Home media
The film had its television premiere on 16 February 2019 on Geo Entertainment, and it was premiered on YouTube on 27 February.

Digital release
The film was made available on Amazone Prime Video to stream online.

Accolades

Soundtrack

Like previous films for the director-producer-duo, this time also the music has been composed by Shani Arshad. The soundtrack album was released on 1 August 2018 by Zee Music Company.

See also
 List of Pakistani films of 2018

References

External links
 
 
 
 

Pakistani romantic comedy films
2018 romantic comedy films
Films about weddings
Geo Films films
2018 films
Pakistani multilingual films
Punjabi-language Pakistani films
2010s Urdu-language films
Films scored by Shani Arshad
2010s Punjabi-language films
2018 multilingual films